The Battle of Delhi in 1757 also referred to as the Second Battle of Delhi, was a battle fought on 11 August 1757 between the Maratha Empire under the command of Raghunath Rao and the Rohillas under the command of Najib-ud-Daula, who was under the Afghan suzerainty and simultaneously the "Pay Master" of what remained of the Mughal Army. The battle was waged by the Marathas for the control of Delhi, the former Mughal capital which was now under the control of Rohilla chief Najib-ud-Daula, as a consequence of the fourth invasion of India by Ahmad Shah Abdali.

Background
Ahmad Shah Durrani invaded North India for the fourth time in early 1757. He entered Delhi in January 1757 and kept the Mughal emperor under arrest. On his return in April 1757, Abdali re-installed the Mughal emperor Alamgir II on Delhi throne as a titular head. However, the actual control of Delhi was given to Najib-ud-Daula, who had promised to pay an annual tribute of 20 lakh rupees to Abdali. Najib had also assisted Abdali in his fourth invasion and had already won the trust of the Afghan emperor. It can be said that he worked as the agent of Abdali in Delhi court. So, Najib was now the de facto ruler of Delhi with Alamgir II as a puppet emperor in his control.

The Mughal emperor and his wazir Imad-ul-Mulk were alarmed by all these developments and hence requested Marathas to help them get rid of Abdali's agents in Delhi.

A contingent of 40,000 Maratha troops was dispatched for attacking Delhi.

Battle
The Marathas encamped opposite the Red Fort on the other side of Yamuna river. Najib gave the charge of 2,500 strong infantry to Qutub Shah and Mulla Aman Khan and himself commanded another infantry contingent of  5,000 troops and heavy artillery and which were deployed by him to prevent Marathas from entering the city. The battle started on 11 August and after two weeks of intense fighting, Najib surrendered and was arrested by Marathas.  

Maratha commander Raghunath Rao demanded immediate withdrawal of Najib from Delhi along with a tribute of 50 lakh rupees. He also promised that he would never return to Delhi and never threaten any Maratha fort.

Aftermath
The Marathas had now become the de facto rulers of Delhi. Raghunath Rao appointed Antaji Mankeshwar as Governor of Delhi province while Alamgir II was retained as titular head with no actual power.

See also
 Battle of Delhi (disambiguation)
 Battle of Plassey (1757)
 Maratha conquest of North-west India
 Battle of Karnal

References

 TVandana Thorpe
 y Walī Allāh al-Dihlawī, Marcia K.

Delhi 1757
Delhi 1757
1757 in India
18th century in Delhi
Delhi 1757